During the 1988–89 English football season, Luton Town F.C. competed in the Football League First Division, in which they finished 16th to secure an eighth successive season at this level. They were holders of the League Cup for this season and maintained their defence of the trophy to the final, where they were beaten by Nottingham Forest.

Despite being League Cup holders, Luton did not compete in the UEFA Cup this season due to the continuation of the ban on English clubs in European competitions arising from the Heysel disaster of 1985.

Season summary
Luton were unable to build on their top-ten finishes of the two previous seasons and finished the season in 16th, just two points clear of relegation. Luton did manage to reach the League Cup final for the second season running, but were unable to defend the cup as they were beaten 3–1 by Nottingham Forest. Survival was achieved on the final day of the season with a 1–0 home win over Norwich City; this was the first of three successive seasons where Luton would secure First Division on the final day of the season before finally being relegated in 1992.

Squad

League table

Results

Key: 1D = First Division FAC = FA Cup LC = League Cup FMC = Full Members Cup

See also
 List of Luton Town F.C. seasons
 1988–89 Football League
 1988–89 FA Cup

References

Luton Town F.C. seasons
Luton Town